Dwivedi or Duvedi or Diwedi or Dubay or Dubey or Dave or Dube or  is an Indian surname meaning versed in two Vedas. The surname is used by Brahmins in northern India. 
Dubey Title Are also called Dwivedi

Origin of surname
Though the common assumption is that Dwivedi means 'one who knows two vedas', oral Hindu tradition has an alternative explanation. In Sanskrit, Dvi = 'two' and Vedi = 'to see'. Therefore, a Dwivedi is one with 'two-fold vision', or someone who is able to distinguish between right and wrong. The practical application is that a Dwivedi was an expert in vedic rituals and can guide the public with regards to what is right and wrong according to Veda. They are in upper fold in four Varna that make them upper caste Hindus. 

There is no limit to the number of vedas an individual can learn, therefore there is no reason why a Dwivedi or Trivedi could not learn all four vedas. The explanation that a Dwivedi only knows two out of four vedas is a very superficial translation of a Sanskrit surname with deeper meaning.

Notable people with the surname Dwivedi

 Chandraprakash Dwivedi - Indian film director and script writer
 Major General G. G. Dwivedi
 Hazari Prasad Dwivedi - Hindi novelist
 Janardan Dwivedi - Politician from Indian National Congress party
 Kapil Deva Dvivedi - Sanskrit Scholar Padma Shri
 Mahavir Prasad Dwivedi - Indian writer
 Manilal Dwivedi (1858–1898) - Gujarati writer and philosopher
 Nikhil Dwivedi - Bollywood actor
 O.P. Dwivedi - Professor emeritus, Order of Canada, Royal Society of Canada
 Brahm Dutt  Dwivedi - BJP Leader who saved UP CM Mayawati from goons
 Ragini Dwivedi - Kannada actress and model
 Ram Chandra Dwivedi -  (AKA Kavi Pradeep) - Poet and songwriter
 Rewa Prasad Dwivedi - Sanskrit scholar and poet
 Satyendra Dubey- Project Director for NHAI, murdered for fighting against corruption
 Seema Dwivedi, Indian politician
 Sharada Dwivedi - Mumbai-based historian and researcher
 Sudhakara Dvivedi - Mathematician

See also
 Trivedi, meaning versed in three vedas
 Upreti, meaning  cessation from worldly pleasure

References

Indian surnames